WOLI (910 kHz) is a Regional Mexican AM radio station located in Spartanburg, South Carolina. The station is licensed by the Federal Communications Commission (FCC) to broadcast with power of 3,600 watts in the daytime and 890 watts at night under separate directional signal patterns.

History
WSPA 950 AM signed on the air on February 17, 1930, as South Carolina's first radio station, beating out WCSC/Charleston and WIS/Columbia by several months. The station was owned by Virgil Evans during its first 10 years on the air. WSPA was sold on June 1, 1940, to the Spartanburg Advertising Company, a group that was formed with the intention on starting a second radio station in Spartanburg, WORD 910 AM, which signed on in September of that year utilizing studio and tower space from WSPA.

In 1944 the FCC ordered the WSPA-WORD combo to be broken up due to ownership regulations which forbid an owner from having no more than one AM station per market. This was completed on March 17, 1947, when WSPA and WSPA-FM was sold to Liberty Life Insurance and WORD was sold to Spartan Radiocasting (WSPA-FM 98.9 signed on as South Carolina's first FM station on August 29, 1946).

In 1952, a dispute erupted between both Spartan Radiocasting and Liberty Life over the Spartanburg allocation for television channel 7 (which was won by Spartan and went on the air as WSPA-TV in 1956. It was settled in 1958 when Spartan Radiocasting bought back WSPA and WSPA-FM from Liberty Life Insurance and spinning off WORD and their FM sister WDXY 100.5 to different ownership.

In 2002, Entercom (then owners of WORD/WYRD) swapped WORD's programming and call letters from 910 AM over to its newly acquired sister, WSPA's signal at 950 AM to gain better coverage. Then in 2005, WSPA as well as the FMs WOLI/WOLT were spun off to Davidson Media Group.  The WSPA call letters were dropped per an agreement with WSPA-TV to surrender the WSPA calls if the radio station ever changed hands.  New calls of WOLI took to the air and simulcasted parts of WOLI-FM programming with brokered programming. In 2007, the simulcasting with the FM ended and the station switched to Spanish Religious programming, but retained the brokered programming, which then switched to black gospel January 2011 through August 2011, a few months of which were simulcast from Davidson-owned WRJD (then known as "Rejoice 1410" in Durham, North Carolina).

September 1, 2011, WOLI relaunched as Yahoo! Sports Radio 910 until January 2012.

In August 2012, WOLI once again became Spartanburg's home to Wofford Terrier sports. After the Terriers left WOLI after the 2004 season, they returned to 910 AM as well as 105.7 FM.

On January 7, 2013, WOLI was relaunched as Earth 105.7 FM with an Oldies format.

On March 1, 2013, the Earth FM oldies format moved to WOLT (since renamed WRTH).  WOLI was relaunched as The Source @ 105.7/AM 910 with an adult standards and brokered programming format. The station also airs local sports.

On July 13, 2015, Davidson Media sold WOLI and eleven other stations to TBLC Holdings, with the sale to be completed on September 30, 2015. The sale was consummated on November 5, 2015, at a purchase price of $3.5 million.

On November 5, 2015, WOLI changed their format to regional Mexican, branded as "Activa 103.9" (at the time simulcasting WTOB-FM 103.9 FM).

Effective June 26, 2020, TBLC Media sold WOLI to Norberto Sanchez's Norsan Media LLC for $150,000.

References

External links

OLI
Radio stations established in 1940
1940 establishments in South Carolina
Regional Mexican radio stations in the United States
Spanish-language radio stations in South Carolina